Dirty Grape is an album by jazz organist Johnny "Hammond" Smith recorded for the Prestige label in 1968.

Reception

The Allmusic site awarded the album 3 stars calling it a "pleasant but moderately by-numbers set of late 1960s soul-jazz".

Track listing
All compositions by Johnny "Hammond" Smith except where noted
 "Hi-Heel Sneakers" (Robert Higginbotham) - 5:47   
 "To Sir With Love" (Don Black, Mark London) - 3:34   
 "Dirty Grape" (Wally Richardson) - 3:05   
 "Animal Farm" - 8:13   
 "Black Strap Molasses" (Richardson) - 3:11   
 "She's Gone Again" - 3:32   
 "Love Is a Hurtin' Thing" (Dave Linden, Ben Raleigh) - 3:45   
 "Please Send Me Someone to Love" (Percy Mayfield) - 5:30

Personnel
Johnny "Hammond" Smith - organ
Earl Edwards, Houston Person - tenor saxophone
Wally Richardson - guitar
Jimmy Lewis - electric bass
John Harris - drums
Richie "Pablo" Landrum - congas

Production
 Cal Lampley - producer
 Rudy Van Gelder - engineer

References

Johnny "Hammond" Smith albums
1968 albums
Prestige Records albums
Albums produced by Cal Lampley
Albums recorded at Van Gelder Studio